Urothemis signata, the greater crimson glider, is a species of dragonfly in the family Libellulidae. It is widespread in many Asian countries. A number of subspecies are recognized for this species.

Subspecies

There are four subspecies are recognized.
 Urothemis signata aliena Selys, 1878 - Australia and New Guinea
 Urothemis signata insignata (Selys, 1872)  - Sundaland
 Urothemis signata signata (Rambur 1842) - India, Sri Lanka, Myanmar, China and Indochina
 Urothemis signata yiei Asahina, 1972 - Taiwan

Description and habitat
It is a medium-sized dragonfly with red eyes. thorax and abdomen. Its wings are transparent with a amber colored spot surrounded by a dark-brown patch in the base of hind-wings. Its abdomen is blood-red, with some black marking on the 
dorsum of segments 8 and 9. Female is similar to the male; but yellowish in color. The black spots on the dorsum is repeated on segments 3 to 7. Juvenile and sub-adult males also have these marks.

This species breeds in ponds and slow flowing rivers, typically in lowland areas. The males often found perch on exposed twigs. This species has managed to colonise urban water bodies and park ponds.

Image Gallery

See also 
 List of odonates of Sri Lanka
 List of odonates of India
 List of odonata of Kerala

References

 signata.html World Dragonflies
 Animal diversity web
 Query Results
 Sri Lanka Biodiversity

External links

Libellulidae
Insects described in 1842